My Mother may refer to:

Ma Mère, a 2004 French-Austrian-Portuguese-Spanish film starring Isabelle Huppert
My Mother, a novel by Georges Bataille that was the basis for the film
Mia Madre, a 2015 French-Italian film starring Margherita Buy
My Mother, a 1971 album by Smiley Bates